Philotheca myoporoides subsp. acuta is a subspecies of flowering plant in the family Rutaceae and is endemic to New South Wales. It is a shrub with narrow oblong or narrow elliptic leaves and white flowers arranged singly or in groups of up to three in leaf axils.

Description
Flowering mainly occurs in spring and autumn.

Taxonomy and naming
This taxon was first formally described in 1941 by William Blakely who gave it the Eriostemon myoporoides var. acutus and published the description in Contributions from the New South Wales Herbarium. In 1998, Michael James Bayly changed the name to Philotheca myoporoides subsp. acuta in the journal Muelleria.

Distribution and habitat
This subspecies grows on rocky sandstone hills, mainly from Lockhart to south of Cobar in southern central New South Wales.

References

myoporoides
Flora of New South Wales
Sapindales of Australia